Thomas De Corte (born 31 March 1988) is a Belgian former professional footballer who played as a right back. He formerly played for Lierse and AGOVV.

Football career
De Corte joined the first team of Lierse in late-2005. He made his breakthrough in the second half of the 2005–06 season at the right back position. Due to an injury, De Corte was soon sidelined. Subsequently, he was sent on loan to another club in Lier; Lyra. After his stint at Lyra, De Corte signed with Royal Antwerp in the Belgian Second Division. In the 2011–12 season, De Corte moved to Dutch second-tier Eerste Divisie club AGOVV after a successful trial. At the beginning of 2013, that club went bankrupt. De Corte then played for amateur clubs Oosterzonen, Houtvenne and FC Berlaar-Heikant.

References

External links
Voetbal International 
 

1988 births
Living people
Belgian footballers
AGOVV Apeldoorn players
Eerste Divisie players
People from Kortenberg
Association football defenders
Oud-Heverlee Leuven players
R.S.C. Anderlecht players
Lierse S.K. players
K. Lyra players
Royal Antwerp F.C. players
Lierse Kempenzonen players
Challenger Pro League players
Belgian Pro League players
Belgian expatriate footballers
Expatriate footballers in the Netherlands
Belgian expatriate sportspeople in the Netherlands
KFC Houtvenne players
Footballers from Flemish Brabant